The Australian Poker Championship, commonly known as Aussie Millions, is a series of poker tournaments held at the Crown Casino, in Melbourne, Australia. The Main Event of the series is the Southern Hemisphere's richest poker tournament with a prize pool in excess of 7 million.

History
Poker at Crown was introduced in June 1997, with the first major championship held shortly after in July 1998. The Main Event was a $1,000 buy in Limit Holdem tournament that attracted 74 entries with a $74,000 prize pool. The Crown Australian Poker Championship, or the 'Aussie Millions' as it became known, moved to January in 2001, attracting 40 entrants with a $5,000 buy in for a prize pool of $200,000. January 2003 saw the event go international, attracting a field of 122 entrants and a $1,200,000 prize pool. In January 2005, the Aussie Millions continued to grow with 263 participants paying $10,000 each to enter the No Limit Hold'em Main Event, generating the biggest prize pool ever in the Southern Hemisphere of $2,630,000. Over half the field was from overseas including players from New Zealand, England, Ireland, Norway, Denmark, the US, Sweden, the Netherlands, Canada, Italy and Lebanon. In 2006, 418 players competed for a share of the $4,180,000 prize pool, including some of the biggest names in the Poker world such as WSOP Champion Joe Hachem, along with Phil Ivey, John Juanda and Daniel Negreanu. The 2007 championship commenced on Sunday 14 January 2007 with the final table held on Friday 19 January 2007.  The buy-in was $10,500 ($10,000+$500).  A record 747 players entered, which generated a prize pool of $7,470,000.  The top 80 players were "in the money" and received between $15,000 and $1,500,000 each.

The 2008 championship concluded on Sunday 20 January 2008 with the winner being the 21-year-old Russian Alexander Kostritsyn. The buy-in was $10,500 ($10,000+$500). A record 780 players entered, which generated a prize pool of $7,800,000.  The top 80 players were "in the money" and received between $15,000 and $1,650,000 each. The 2009 event will feature a total of 15 tournaments. The Main Event will have a guaranteed $2 million first prize.  It will also feature ten players taking part in the first Million Dollar Poker Cash Game, the largest poker game of its kind anywhere in the world.  Ten players will be required to stake a minimum of $1 million, though it is expected that some players will bring more to the table. The Aussie Millions is now regarded as the largest poker tournament in the Southern Hemisphere and the sixth-largest internationally (by prizepool).

Television
In 2013, Crown's Aussie Millions Poker Championship television coverage, produced by McGuire Media in conjunction with Poker PROductions, was a nine-episode series broadcast on One HD and ESPN Australia. The series was hosted by Lynn Gilmartin, with commentary by Joe Hachem and Jonno Pittock, as well as pro analysis by Antonio Esfandiari.

Main Event structure
The structure of the Main Event is slightly different from that of most other major tournaments. While most major Hold 'em tournaments, including the World Series of Poker Main Event, play at nine-handed tables throughout, the Aussie Millions Main Event begins with eight-handed tables. Play continues eight-handed until the field is reduced to 36 players, at which point all tables are six-handed. The 2009 Aussie Millions Main Event structure will see Day 1 divided into three flights, with blind levels of 90 minutes' duration.  From Day 2 until the completion of the tournament, the blind levels are 120 minutes long.

High roller events
The Aussie Millions is also known for its high roller tournaments, which have featured some of the highest buy-ins in history.

$100,000 Challenge
The high roller trend began in 2006 when the Aussie Millions launched its $100,000 No Limit Holdem Challenge (actual buy in is $100,500, including the $500 entry fee), at that time billed as the highest buy-in of any poker tournament in history. It has a particularly unusual structure:
 Players start with 100,000 chips, a comparatively larger amount compared to both the Aussie Millions and WSOP Main Events.
 Betting is pot limit preflop and no limit afterwards.
 Players are allowed only 30 seconds to act on their hands. At the start of the tournament, each player is given three extensions of 30 seconds each for use during the tournament.
The $100,000 Challenge was first played in 2006, with 10 entrants. Eighteen entered the Challenge in 2007, 25 in 2008, and 24 in 2010. Daniel Shak won the 2010 tournament for a total prize of A$1,200,000. A record field of 38 played in the 2011 edition.

$250,000 Super High Roller
With a number of other poker events adding tournaments with buy-ins comparable to that of the $100,000 Challenge, the Aussie Millions added a tournament with a $250,000 buy-in in 2011, which the organisers again claimed as the world's highest. (Since then, the World Series of Poker has held an official event with a US$1 million buy-in.) It was originally scheduled to be a heads-up no-limit event, but the organisers changed the format twice, settling on what they thought would be a single-table no-limit hold 'em tournament. However, 20 players entered the inaugural $250K tournament, including major stars Phil Ivey, Erik Seidel, Tom Dwan, Chris Ferguson, John Juanda, David Benyamine and Annette Obrestad, plus Sam Trickett, who had just won that year's $100K event. Seidel, who had finished second in the $100K event, won the $2.5 million first prize, defeating Trickett in heads-up play.

The 2012 event was won by Ivey, who defeated 15 other players to win $2 million, the largest prize of his career. Trickett won the 2013 event, also winning $2 million after defeating 17 other players.

Results

Main Event Winners

1998 Australian Poker Championships (Limit Hold'em)
 Buy-in: $1,000
 Date: 26 July 1998
 Number of buy-ins: 74
 Total Prize Pool: $74,000
 Number of Payouts: 9

1999 Australian Poker Championships (Pot-Limit Hold'em) 
 Buy-in: $1,000
 Date: August 1999
 Number of buy-ins: 109
 Total Prize Pool: $109,000
 Number of Payouts: 18

2000 Australian Poker Championships 
 Buy-in: $1,500
 Date: Sunday, 27 August 2000
 Number of buy-ins: 109
 Total Prize Pool: $173,500
 Number of Payouts: 18

2001 Australian Poker Championships 
 Buy-in: $1,500
 Date: Friday, 24 August 2001
 Number of buy-ins: 101
 Total Prize Pool: $151,500
 Number of Payouts: 18

2002 Australian Poker Championships 
 Buy-in: $5,000
 2-Day Event: Friday, 11 January 2002 to Saturday, 12 January 2002
 Number of buy-ins: 66
 Total Prize Pool: $330,000
 Number of Payouts: 10

2003 Crown Australian Poker Championships 
 Buy-in: $10,000
 Date: Sunday, 12 January 2003
 Number of buy-ins: 122
 Total Prize Pool: $1,220,000
 Number of Payouts: 18

2004 Crown Australian Poker Championships 
 Buy-in: $10,000
 Date: Thursday, 15 January 2004
 Number of buy-ins: 133
 Total Prize Pool: $1,330,000
 Number of Payouts: 18

2005 Crown Australian Poker Championships 
 Buy-in: $10,000
 3-Day Event: Tuesday, 18 January 2005 to Thursday, 20 January 2005
 Number of buy-ins: 263
 Total Prize Pool: $2,630,000
 Number of Payouts: 40

2006 Crown Australian Poker Championships 
 Buy-in: $10,000
 6-Day Event: Saturday, 14 January 2006 to Thursday, 19 January 2006
 Number of buy-ins: 418
 Total Prize Pool: $4,180,000
 Number of Payouts: 48

2007 Crown Australian Poker Championships 
 Buy-in: $10,000
 6-Day Event: Sunday, 14 January 2007 to Friday, 19 January 2007
 Number of buy-ins: 747
 Total Prize Pool: $7,470,000
 Number of Payouts: 80

2008 Crown Australian Poker Championships 
 Buy-in: $10,000
 6-Day Event: Sunday, 14 January 2008 to Friday, 19 January 2008
 Number of buy-ins: 780
 Total Prize Pool: A$7,758,500
 Number of Payouts: 80

2009 Crown Australian Poker Championship
 Buy-in: $10,000
 7-Day Event: Saturday, 17 January 2009 to Friday, 23 January 2009
 Number of buy-ins: 681
 Total Prize Pool: $6,810,000
 Number of Payouts: 64

2010 Crown Australian Poker Championship
 Buy-in: $10,000
 7-Day Event: Sunday, 24 January 2010 to Saturday, 30 January 2010
 Number of buy-ins: 746
 Total Prize Pool: $7,460,000
 Number of Payouts: 72

2011 Crown Australian Poker Championship
 Buy-in: $10,000
 7-Day Event: Sunday, 23 January 2011 to Saturday, 29 January 2011
 Number of buy-ins: 721
 Total Prize Pool: $7,210,000
 Number of Payouts: 72

2012 Crown Australian Poker Championship
 Buy-in: $10,000
 7-Day Event: Sunday, 22 January 2012 to Saturday, 28 January 2012
 Number of buy-ins: 659
 Total Prize Pool: $6,590,000
 Number of Payouts: 72

2013 Crown Australian Poker Championship
 Buy-in: $10,000
 7-Day Event: Sunday, 27 January to Saturday, 2 February 2013
 Number of buy-ins: 629
 Total Prize Pool: $6,290,000
 Number of Payouts: 64

2014 Aussie Millions Poker Championship
 Buy-in: $10,600
 7-Day Event: Sunday, 2 February to Sunday, 9 February 2014
 Number of buy-ins: 668
 Total Prize Pool: $6,680,000
 Number of Payouts: 72

2015 Aussie Millions Poker Championship
 Buy-in: $10,600
 7-Day Event: 25 January–February 1
 Number of buy-ins: 648
 Total Prize Pool: $6,480,000
 Number of Payouts: 72

2016 Aussie Millions Poker Championship
 Buy-in: $10,600
 6-Day Event: 25–31 January
 Number of buy-ins: 732
 Total Prize Pool: $7,320,000
 Number of Payouts: 81

2017 Aussie Millions Poker Championship
 Buy-in: $10,000
 9-Day Event: 22–30 January
 Number of buy-ins: 725
 Total Prize Pool: $7,685,000
 Number of Payouts: 80

2018 Aussie Millions Poker Championship
 Buy-in: $10,600
 8-Day Event: 28 January–February 4
 Number of buy-ins: 800
 Total Prize Pool: $8,000,000
 Number of Payouts: 88

2019 Aussie Millions Poker Championship
 Buy-in: $10,600
 7-Day Event: 28 January–February 3
 Number of buy-ins: 822
 Total Prize Pool: $8,220,000
 Number of Payouts: 88

*-The final three players made a deal, with Kenney being crowned champion

2020 Aussie Millions Poker Championship
 Buy-in: $10,600
 7-Day Event: 17–24 January 2020
 Number of buy-ins: 820
 Total Prize Pool: $8,200,000
 Number of Payouts: 88

* - Denotes deal between the final three players

High Roller Winners (A$100,000 Challenge)

Super High Roller Winners (A$250,000 Challenge)

References

External links
Official site

Poker tournaments
Sports competitions in Melbourne
Poker in Australia